Dziri is a Maghrebian surname. It means 'Algerian' in Algerian Arabic. Notable people with the surname include:

Billel Dziri (born 1972), Algerian footballer
Lotfi Dziri (1964–2013), Tunisian actor
Slim Dziri (1875–1953), Tunisian politician

Arabic-language surnames